The 2006 Tennessee gubernatorial election was held on November 7, 2006. Incumbent Democratic governor Phil Bredesen defeated Republican State Senator Jim Bryson in a landslide to win a second term as Governor of Tennessee, winning every county in the state. 

Only Davidson, Shelby, Haywood, Hardeman, Houston, Jackson, and Lake counties have voted for a Democratic candidate in a Presidential, Senate, or gubernatorial race since 2006, with Jackson and Lake only going Democratic once. Eight years later, Republican Governor Bill Haslam won every county in the state when he won re-election. This marked a sharp political shift in Tennessee.

Democratic primary

Candidates
Phil Bredesen, incumbent Governor of Tennessee
John Jay Hooker, perennial candidate
Tim Sevier
Walt Ward

Results

Republican primary

Candidates
Jim Bryson, State Senator
David M. Farmer
Joe Kirkpatrick
Mark Albertini
Wayne Thomas Bailey
Wayne Young
Timothy Thomas

Results

General election

Candidates
Phil Bredesen (D)
Jim Bryson (R)
Carl Two Feathers Whitaker (I)
George Banks (I)
Charles E. Smith (I)
Howard W. Switzer (I)
David Gatchell (I)
Marivuana Stout Leinoff (I)

Predictions

Polling

Results

See also
2006 United States gubernatorial elections

References

External links
Official campaign websites (Archived)
Phil Bredesen for Governor
Jim Bryson for Governor
Carl Whitaker for Governor
Mark Albertini for Governor
Combat Ward for Governor

Gubernatorial
2006
Tennessee